Shahid Anwar (born 5 July 1968) is a former Pakistani International cricketer.

Playing career

International
Anwar made his one-day debut against England, scoring 37 runs but was never recalled to the national team.

Domestic

In domestic cricket he represented Lahore, Bahawalpur, National Bank of Pakistan, Pakistan Automobiles Corporation, Pakistan National Shipping Corporation during his career and also played on the UK Cricket League Circuit. He captained the National Bank Grade 1 and Lahore Grade 1 teams to national championships (both as captain) and appeared in 216 first-class games as a batting all-rounder, scoring 12100 runs (at 34.87) with a highest score of 195, as well as appearing in 152 list "A" matches. His first-class career is punctuated with 26 centuries and 63 half centuries. Anwar took 61 wickets in first-class cricket with a career best of 6/2.

Coaching

After retiring from first-class cricket, Shahid proceeded to become one of the most successful cricket coaches in Pakistan. After completing Level I, II and III cricket coaching diplomas from CA (Cricket Australia), he joined Sialkot Stallions as their head coach and propelled them to National T-20 Championship, and the National Bank side to the 2011 One day championship runner-up position. He also coached Pakistan "A" team during its tour to Australia in 2010.

References

Pakistani cricketers
Pakistan One Day International cricketers
Lahore City Whites cricketers
Lahore City cricketers
Pakistan National Shipping Corporation cricketers
Bahawalpur cricketers
Pakistan Automobiles Corporation cricketers
National Bank of Pakistan cricketers
Lahore Blues cricketers
Lahore City Blues cricketers
Pakistan Starlets cricketers
1968 births
Living people
Pakistani cricket coaches
Cricketers from Multan